The Rhoades House, at 1024 Grant Ave. in Louisville, Colorado in Boulder County, Colorado, was built in 1906.  It was listed on the National Register of Historic Places in 1986.

It was originally owned by George W. Rhoades. In 1985 it was deemed "one of the best intact examples of Queen Anne Vernacular architecture in Louisville, and well illustrates the modest housing erected by coal miners in the community in the early 20th century." At the time of listing both its interior and exterior were "virtually intact".

It may in fact be a Sears catalog house.

The property also included a contributing structure: a historic frame shed, and a non-contributing garage.

Notes

References

National Register of Historic Places in Boulder County, Colorado
Houses completed in 1906
Queen Anne architecture in Colorado